The 2016–17 Syed Mushtaq Ali Trophy was the ninth edition of the Syed Mushtaq Ali Trophy competition, an Indian domestic team only Twenty20 cricket tournament in India. It was initially played between 27 teams divided into four groups in round-robin format, but it was announced that the 2016–17 edition would be play within each of the five zones in a round-robin format. The tournament was held from 12–18 February 2017 and all matches were played in Mumbai. The winner of each zone progressed to the inter-zonal competition. The interstate tournament was held from 29 January to 6 February 2017. These tournaments were hosted at Baroda (West), Chennai (South), Dharamsala (North), Jaipur (Central) and Kolkata (East).

Squads

Points Table

Fixtures

References

External links
 Series home at ESPN Cricinfo

Syed Mushtaq Ali Trophy
Syed Mushtaq Ali Trophy